The  1973 WFA Cup Final was the 3rd final of the WFA Cup, England's primary cup competition for women's football teams.

Match

Summary

The match ended 2-0 to Southampton Women's F.C. favour.

References

External links
 
 Report at WomensFACup.co.uk

Cup
Women's FA Cup finals
April 1973 sports events in the United Kingdom